Kloštar Ivanić is a settlement and the surrounding municipality in central Croatia, located in the Zagreb County, about 50 kilometres southeast of the city of Zagreb and 30 kilometers north of Sisak. According to the 2011 census, there are 6,091 inhabitants in Kloštar Ivanić proper and the surrounding ten villages which make up the municipality, 97.2% of whom are ethnic Croats. The municipality is part of the Moslavina microregion. The nearest town is Ivanić-Grad, only 4 kilometres away.

Settlements
Like most municipalities of Croatia, Kloštar Ivanić is almost entirely rural, consisting of a collection of villages, the largest of which is also called Kloštar Ivanić and which serves as municipal seat. The following is a list of settlements with their populations in brackets, per the 2011 Croatian census.

 Bešlinec (390)
 Čemernica Lonjska (261)
 Donja Obreška (130)
 Gornja Obreška (119)
 Kloštar Ivanić (3,583)
 Krišci (211)
 Lipovec Lonjski (375)
 Predavec (258)
 Sobočani (460)
 Stara Marča (138)
 Šćapovec (166)

References

External links 
 

Populated places in Zagreb County
Municipalities of Croatia